Plume Latraverse (born Michel Latraverse 11 May 1946) is a prolific singer, musician, songwriter and author from Quebec. At the end of the 1960s he formed a band named La Sainte Trinité with Pierrot le fou (Pierre Léger) and Pierre Landry. Then he formed a duo with Steve Faulkner (1972-1975). They performed for the last time at the Chant'Août in Quebec City. In 1976, Plume started a solo career and became one of the most influential names in Quebec counterculture. During a European tour (1979-1980) he staged a show during Le Printemps de Bourges and won the Prime Minister of France's Prize (Prix international de la jeune chanson) and the Pop-Rock prize for the best songwriter from Quebec. In 1982 he worked with Offenbach and produced the album À fond d'train. After his filmed biography, Ô rage électrique, Plume presented his show Show d'à diable in 1984, after which he brought his singing career to a close. He then focused on painting and writing. He published many of his songs, texts and a storybook.

In 1980 the Montreal Gazette described him as "the French Frank Zappa".

Discography

Albums
Triniterre (1971)
Plume Pou Digne (1974)
Le Vieux Show Son Sale (1975)
Pommes De Route (1975)
À Deux Faces (1976)
All Dressed (1978)
Chirurgie Plastique (1980)
French Tour 1980 (fausse représentation) (1980)
Livraison par en-arrière (1981)
Métamorphoses Tôme I (1982)
Autopsie Canalisée (1983)
Les Mauvais Compagnons (métaphorme...ose II) (1984)
Insomni-fère (méphortamoses III)(1985)
D'un Début À l'Autre (1987)
Chansons Pour Toutes Sortes de Monde (1990)
Chansons Nouvelles (1994)
Mixed Grill (1998)
Chants d'Épuration (2003)
Hors-Saisons (2007)
Chansons nouvelles – revisitées (2008)
Plumonymes (2008)
RECHUT! (Odes de ma tanière) (2016)

Live albums
En Noir Et Blanc (1976)
Cinéma Outremont (1977)
À Fond d'Train (1983)
Vingtemps (2001)

Compilations

Les Plus Pires Succès de Plume (1976)
Le Lour Passé De Plume Latraverse Vol. I (1988)
Le Lour Passé De Plume Latraverse Vol. II (1989)
Le Lour Passé De Plume Latraverse Vol. III (1990)
Le Lour Passé De Plume Latraverse Vol. IV (1992)
Le Lour Passé De Plume Latraverse Vol. V (1995)

Singles
Rideau / Bossa-Mota
Bobépine / Lit vert
La bienséance / U.F.O
Salusoleil / Le retour à la terre
La p'tite vingnenne pis l'gros torrieu / Houba houba
Le grand barda / Marie-Lou
Mognon donc / New Orleans
Salut Trenet / Cul-d'sac rock
Quatre ans après / Élégie
Le fermier Jean / Valse cliché
Dis-moé / On peut pas tout avoir
Parade de mode / Descente aux enfers
La piste cyclable / Ti-gars
La ballade de Sandale et Gandhi / Instrumental
Tant qu'on pourra
El Nino
La journée du chèque

Books
Contes gouttes  (1990)
Pas d'admission sans histoire  (1993)
Striboule  (1995)

References

External links
Official site in French
Biography in French

1946 births
Canadian rock singers
Canadian male singers
Writers from Montreal
Songwriters from Quebec
Living people
French-language singers of Canada
Singers from Montreal